Estrella Castle is a castle in Montiel, province of Ciudad Real, Spain. It was built by the Arabs in the 9th century and was renovated in 1226, after being reconquered by the Christians.

References 

Buildings and structures in the Province of Ciudad Real
Castles in Castilla–La Mancha